Sanda Toma (later Urichianu, born 24 February 1956) is a retired Romanian rower. Competing in single sculls she won the world title in 1979 and 1981 and an Olympic gold medal in 1980.

Toma first trained  in handball and athletics, winning four junior national titles in throwing events, before changing to rowing. In 1976 she was included to the national team, where she first competed in doubles, together with Olga Homeghi. In 1979 she changed to single sculls. Between 1979 and 1981 she remained unbeaten in this event and was named Romanian Sportsperson of the Year three times in a row.

Toma graduated in physical education from the West University of Timișoara. After retiring from competitions she devoted herself to family and teaching, lecturing at the Bucharest Military Academy and University of Ecology in Bucharest.

References

1956 births
Living people
People from Ștefănești, Botoșani
Olympic rowers of Romania
Olympic gold medalists for Romania
Romanian female rowers
Rowers at the 1980 Summer Olympics
Medalists at the 1980 Summer Olympics

World Rowing Championships medalists for Romania